Hans v. Louisiana, 134 U.S. 1 (1890), was a decision of the United States Supreme Court determining that the Eleventh Amendment prohibits a citizen of a U.S. state to sue that state in a federal court. Citizens cannot bring suits against their own state for cases related to the federal constitution and federal laws.  The court left open the question of whether a citizen may sue his or her state in state courts. That ambiguity was resolved in Alden v. Maine (1999), in which the Court held that a state's sovereign immunity forecloses suits against a state government in state court.

Facts
The plaintiff, Hans, was a citizen of the state of Louisiana. Hans owned bonds issued by the state, and was concerned that a recent change to the state constitution would render the bonds invalid. Hans filed a suit against the state in the United States District Court, asserting that Louisiana was impairing the obligations of a contract, which was forbidden by Article I, Section 10 of the United States Constitution.

Issue
The question facing the Court was "whether a state can be sued in a Circuit Court of the United States by one of its own citizens upon a suggestion that the case is one that arises under the Constitution or laws of the United States." The Court noted that the Constitution does not specifically provide for federal jurisdiction in suits between a citizen and a state, but Article III does give the federal courts jurisdiction over "all cases" arising under the Constitution and laws of the United States. Here, Hans was asserting a violation of the federal Constitution as his cause of action.

Furthermore, the Court was well aware that nearly a century earlier, in the Supreme Court decision in Chisholm v. Georgia, holding that states could be sued in federal courts by citizens of other states, had sparked negative reaction, and two years later Congress and the states expressed their will in the Eleventh Amendment. That Amendment expressly forbade citizens of one state from suing another state, but said nothing about citizens suing their own state. Thus the Court was left to resolve the issue of whether such a suit was therefore allowed.

Result

Justice Joseph Bradley, writing for the Court, first examined the discussions surrounding the ratification of the Constitution. He noted that Alexander Hamilton had written a passage in The Federalist Papers, in  Federalist No. 81, assuring his audience that the Constitution would not remove the states' traditional immunity from lawsuits. The Court then examined similar language in statements made by James Madison and John Marshall in the Virginia convention held to ratify the Constitution. Both asserted that the federal power to hear claims brought by a state against a citizen of another state would not apply in the reverse, hence that one state could not be sued in federal court by citizens of another.

The Court suggested that the framers of the Constitution had not addressed the possibility of a citizen suing his own state because such a thing would simply be inconceivable to them. At the time the Constitution was written, states had always been immune from such suits, unless the state itself consented to be sued. Furthermore, the Judiciary Acts of 1789 and 1802 had granted the federal courts jurisdiction "concurrent with the courts of the several states," indicating that the Congress had not contemplated the possibility that the federal courts would have any powers unknown to the state courts.

Finally, the Court noted the argument made by Justice Marshall in another case, that the Supreme Court could hear appeals of a state's successful suit against a citizen precisely because this was not the same thing as a citizen's suit against the state. Instead, Marshall compared them to suits against the United States, which were clearly forbidden at the time.

Harlan's concurrence
Justice John Marshall Harlan wrote a brief concurring opinion, agreeing with the outcome in the case, but asserting that the Court's criticism of the Chisholm case was misplaced. Harlan thought that Chisholm had been decided correctly, based on the language of the Constitution at the time of the decision.

Later developments
Ex parte Young (1908) determined that a citizen could sue a state official to prevent that official from carrying out a state policy that was deemed unconstitutional. Fitzpatrick v. Bitzer found that the Fourteenth Amendment gave the Congress the power to abrogate state immunity from suit to the extent that this was necessary to protect Constitutional rights protected by the Amendment.

In 1987, Welch v. Texas Department of Highways led to a 5–4 decision in the U.S. Supreme Court, with Justice Antonin Scalia "concurring in part and concurring in the judgment." Four justices upheld Hans, while Justice Antonin Scalia concluded that Congress had assumed Hans when enacting the Jones Act and the Federal Employer's Liability Act.

In the late 1990s, the Rehnquist court issued a series of decisions reinforcing state immunity from suit under the Eleventh Amendment, starting with Seminole Tribe v. Florida (1996).

See also
List of United States Supreme Court cases, volume 134

References

External links
 
 

United States Supreme Court cases
United States Supreme Court cases of the Fuller Court
1890 in United States case law
United States Eleventh Amendment case law
Legal history of Louisiana
1890 in Louisiana
Government bonds issued by the United States